Edwardsiella is a genus of sea anemones in the family Edwardsiidae. It is named in honour of Henri Milne-Edwards, an eminent French zoologist.

Species
The following species are listed by the World Register of Marine Species.
Edwardsiella andrillae  (Daly, Rack & Zook, 2013)
Edwardsiella carnea  (Gosse, 1856)
Edwardsiella ignota  (Carlgren, 1959)
Edwardsiella janthina  (Andrès, 1881)
Edwardsiella lineata  (Verrill in Baird, 1873)
Edwardsiella loveni  (Carlgren, 1892)

References

Edwardsiidae
Hexacorallia genera
Taxa named by Angelo Andres